Like Someone in Love is an album by Art Blakey and The Jazz Messengers. It was recorded in August 1960, at the same sessions which produced A Night in Tunisia, but was released on Blue Note only in August 1967. It features performances by Blakey with Lee Morgan, Wayne Shorter, Bobby Timmons, and Jymie Merritt.

Track listing 
 "Like Someone in Love" (Burke, Van Heusen) - 8:04
 "Johnny's Blue" (Morgan) - 9:12
 "Noise in the Attic" (Shorter) - 7:54
 "Sleeping Dancer Sleep On" (Shorter) - 8:06
 "Giantis" (Shorter) - 5:35
 "Sleeping Dancer Sleep On" [Alternate Take] - 8:05 Bonus track on CD

Recorded on August 7 (#3, 4, 6) and August 14 (#1, 2, 5), 1960.

Personnel 
 Art Blakey – drums
 Lee Morgan – trumpet, flugelhorn
 Wayne Shorter – tenor saxophone
 Bobby Timmons – piano
 Jymie Merritt – bass

References 

1966 albums
Art Blakey albums
The Jazz Messengers albums
Albums produced by Alfred Lion
Blue Note Records albums
Albums recorded at Van Gelder Studio